Lenin's Testament is a document dictated by Vladimir Lenin in late 1922 and early 1923. In the testament, Lenin proposed changes to the structure of the Soviet governing bodies. Sensing his impending death, he also gave criticism of Bolshevik leaders Zinoviev, Kamenev, Trotsky, Bukharin, Pyatakov and Stalin. He warned of the possibility of a split developing in the party leadership between Trotsky and Stalin if proper measures were not taken to prevent it. In a post-script he also suggested Joseph Stalin be removed from his position as General Secretary of the Russian Communist Party's Central Committee.

Background

Lenin was seriously ill by the latter half of 1921, experiencing hyperacusis, insomnia, and regular headaches. At the Politburo's insistence, in July he left Moscow for a month's leave at his Gorki mansion, where he was cared for by his wife and sister. Lenin began to contemplate the possibility of suicide, asking both Krupskaya and Stalin to acquire potassium cyanide for him. Twenty-six physicians were hired to help Lenin during his final years; many of them were foreign and had been hired at great expense. Some suggested that his sickness could have been caused by metal oxidation from the bullets that were lodged in his body from the 1918 assassination attempt; in April 1922 he underwent a surgical operation to remove them. The symptoms continued after this, with Lenin's doctors unsure of the cause; some suggested that he had neurasthenia or cerebral arteriosclerosis. In May 1922, he had his first stroke, temporarily losing his ability to speak and being paralysed on his right side. He convalesced at Gorki, and had largely recovered by July. In October, he returned to Moscow; in December, he had a second stroke and returned to Gorki.

In Lenin's absence, Stalin had begun consolidating his power both by appointing his supporters to prominent positions, and by cultivating an image of himself as Lenin's closest intimate and deserving successor. In December 1922, Stalin took responsibility for Lenin's regimen, being tasked by the Politburo with controlling who had access to him. Lenin was increasingly critical of Stalin; while Lenin was insisting that the state should retain its monopoly on international trade during mid-1922, Stalin was leading other Bolsheviks in unsuccessfully opposing this. There were personal arguments between the two as well; Stalin had upset Krupskaya by shouting at her during a phone conversation, which in turn greatly angered Lenin, who sent Stalin a letter expressing his annoyance.

In October 1922, Lenin proposed that Trotsky should become first deputy chairman of the Council of People's Commissars at a meeting of the Central Committee, but Trotsky declined the position. This has been interpreted as evidence that Lenin designated Trotsky as a successor as head of government.  During December 1922 and January 1923, Lenin dictated "Lenin's Testament", in which he discussed the personal qualities of his comrades, particularly Trotsky and Stalin.

Document history
Lenin wanted the testament to be read out at the 12th Party Congress of the Communist Party of the Soviet Union, to be held in April 1923. The document was originally dictated to Lenin's personal secretary, Lydia Fotiyeva. However, after Lenin's third stroke in March 1923 that left him paralyzed and unable to speak, the testament was kept secret by his wife, Nadezhda Krupskaya, in the hope of Lenin's eventual recovery. She possessed four copies while Maria Ulyanova, Lenin's sister, had one. It was only after Lenin's death, on January 21, 1924, that she turned the document over to the Communist Party Central Committee Secretariat and asked for it to be made available to the delegates of the 13th Party Congress in May 1924.

An edited version of the testament was printed in December 1927 in a limited edition made available to 15th Party Congress delegates. The case for making the testament more widely available was undermined by the consensus within the party leadership that it could not be printed publicly as it would damage the party as a whole.

The text of the testament and the fact of its concealment soon became known in the West, especially after the circumstances surrounding the controversy were described by Max Eastman in Since Lenin Died (1925). The full English text of Lenin's testament was published as part of an article by Eastman that appeared in The New York Times in 1926. In response to Eastman's article, Trotsky described the claim that the Central Committee concealed the testament as "pure slander." Trotsky also rejected the characterization of the document as a "will," describing the document as one of Lenin's letters providing advice on organizational matters.

Historian Stephen Kotkin argued that the evidence for Lenin's authorship of the Testament is weak and suggested that the Testament could have been created by Krupskaya. However, the Testament has been accepted as genuine by other historians, including E. H. Carr, Isaac Deutscher, Dmitri Volkogonov, Vadim Rogovin and Oleg Khlevniuk, and Kotkin's argument was specifically rejected by Richard Pipes.

Related documents
This term is not to be confused with "Lenin's Political Testament", a term used in Leninism to refer to a set of letters and articles dictated by Lenin during his illness on how to continue the construction of the Soviet state. Traditionally, it includes the following works:
A Letter to a Congress, "Письмо к съезду"
About Assigning of Legislative Functions to Gosplan, "О придании законодательных функций Госплану"
To the "Nationalities Issue" or about "Autonomization", "К 'вопросу о национальностях' или об 'автономизации' "
Pages from the Diary, "Странички из дневника"
About Cooperation, "О кооперации"
About Our Revolution, "О нашей революции"
How shall We Reorganise the Rabkrin, "Как нам реорганизовать Рабкрин"
Better Less but Better, "Лучше меньше, да лучше"

Contents 
The letter is a critique of the Soviet government as it then stood. It warned of dangers that he anticipated and made suggestions for the future. Some of those suggestions included increasing the size of the Party's Central Committee, giving the State Planning Committee legislative powers and changing the nationalities policy, which had been implemented by Stalin.

Stalin and Trotsky were criticised:

Lenin felt that Stalin had more power than he could handle and might be dangerous if he was Lenin's successor. In a postscript written a few weeks later, Lenin recommended Stalin's removal from the position of General Secretary of the Party:

Marxist historian Ludo Martens argues that the postscript's complaints about Stalin's coarseness refers to a rebuke that Stalin had made to Krupskaya twelve days earlier.

By power, Trotsky argued Lenin meant administrative power, rather than political influence, within the party. Trotsky pointed out that Lenin had effectively accused Stalin of a lack of loyalty.

In the 30 December 1922 article, Nationalities Issue, Lenin criticized the actions of Felix Dzerzhinsky, Grigoriy Ordzhonikidze and Stalin in the Georgian Affair by accusing them of "Great Russian Chauvinism".

Lenin also criticised other Politburo members:

Finally, he criticised two younger Bolshevik leaders, Bukharin and Pyatakov:

Isaac Deutscher, a biographer of both Trotsky and Stalin, wrote that "the whole testament breathed uncertainty".

Political impact and repercussions

Short term
Lenin's testament presented the ruling triumvirate or troika (Joseph Stalin, Grigory Zinoviev and Lev Kamenev) with an uncomfortable dilemma. On the one hand, they would have preferred to suppress the testament since it was critical of all three of them as well as of their ally Nikolai Bukharin and their opponents, Leon Trotsky and Georgy Pyatakov. Although Lenin's comments were damaging to all of the communist leaders, Joseph Stalin stood to lose the most since the only practical suggestion in the testament was to remove him from the position of the General Secretary of the Party's Central Committee.

On the other hand, the leadership dared not go directly against Lenin's wishes so soon after his death, especially with his widow insisting on having them carried out. The leadership was also in the middle of a factional struggle over the control of the Party, the ruling faction being loosely allied groups that would soon part ways, which would have made a coverup difficult.

The final compromise proposed by the triumvirate at the Council of the Elders of the 13th Congress after Kamenev read out the text of the document was to make Lenin's testament available to the delegates on the following conditions (first made public in a pamphlet by Trotsky published in 1934 and confirmed by documents released during and after glasnost):

 The testament would be read by representatives of the party leadership to each regional delegation separately.
 Taking notes would not be allowed.
 The testament would not be referred to during the plenary meeting of the Congress.

The proposal was adopted by a majority vote, over Krupskaya's objections. As a result, the testament did not have the effect that Lenin had hoped for, and Stalin retained his position as General Secretary, with the notable help of Aleksandr Petrovich Smirnov, then People’s Commissar of Agriculture.

Long term
Failure to make the document more widely available within the party remained a point of contention during the struggle between the Left Opposition and the Stalin-Bukharin faction in 1924 to 1927. Under pressure from the opposition, Stalin had to read the testament again at the July 1926 Central Committee meeting.

Lenin's concerns over Stalin's harsh leadership and over a split between Trotsky and Stalin were later confirmed, with Trotsky being expelled from the Soviet Union by the Politburo in February 1929. He spent the rest of his life in exile, writing prolifically and engaging in open critique of Stalinism. In 1938 Trotsky and his supporters founded the Fourth International in opposition to Stalin's Comintern. After surviving multiple attempts on his life, Trotsky was assassinated in August 1940 in Mexico City by Ramón Mercader, an agent of the Soviet NKVD. Written out of Soviet history books under Stalin, Trotsky was one of the few rivals of Stalin to not be rehabilitated by either Nikita Khrushchev or Mikhail Gorbachev. Trotsky's rehabilitation came in June 2001 by the Russian Federation.

From the time that Stalin consolidated his position as the unquestioned leader of the Communist Party and the Soviet Union, in the late 1920s, all references to Lenin's testament were considered anti-Soviet agitation and punishable as such. The denial of the existence of Lenin's testament remained one of the cornerstones of historiography in the Soviet Union until Stalin's death on March 5, 1953. After Nikita Khrushchev's On the Cult of Personality and Its Consequences, at the 20th Congress of the Communist Party, in 1956, the document was finally published officially by the Soviet government.

References

Notes

Citations

Bibliography
Journals
 
Newspapers

External links
Lenin's Last Testament (text)
On the suppressed Testament of Lenin by Leon Trotsky (written in December 1932, published in 1934, sometimes incorrectly dated as 1926)

1922 documents
1923 documents
Documents of the Soviet Union
Lenin
Works by Vladimir Lenin